Sir George Tressady is a novel by Mary Augusta Ward. Originally published as a serial from 1895 to 1896, it was Ward's seventh novel.

Notes

Further reading

 "Another Tract for the Times," The Book Buyer, Vol. 13, No. 10, 1896, pp. 641–642.
 "Mrs. Ward's New Novel," The Athenaeum, No. 3596, 1896, pp. 413–414.
 "Sir George Tressady," The Atlantic Monthly, Vol. 78, No. 470, 1896, pp. 841–843.
 Cooper, J.A. (1896). "Mrs. Ward's New Novel: A Review," The Canadian Magazine, Vol. 8, No. 2, pp. 179–181.
 Elliot, Arthur D. (1897). "Sir George Tressady," The Edinburgh Review, Vol. 185, No. 379, pp. 84–109.
 Gilder, Jeannette L. (1896). "Shows Mrs. Ward’s Gifts," The Chicago Sunday Tribune, 27 September 1896, p. 33.
 Rives, Françoise (1974). "Fiction and Politics in Sir George Tressady." In: Politics in Literature in the Nineteenth Century. Ed. Janie Teissedou. Lille, France: Univ. de Lille III, pp. 185–202.
 Traill, H.D. (1896). "Sir George Tressady and the Political Novel," The Fortnightly Review, Vol. 60, No. 359, pp. 703–714 (rep. in The Living Age, Vol. 211, No. 2735, 1896, pp. 647–656.)
 Woods, Katharine Pearson (1896). "Mrs. Ward and 'The New Woman'," The Bookman, Vol. 4, pp. 245–247.

External links
 Sir George Tressady, at Internet Archive
 Sir George Tressady, at Hathi Trust
 Sir George Tressady, Vol. II, at Project Gutenberg

Victorian novels
1896 British novels
British philosophical novels
Novels by Mary Augusta Ward
Novels first published in serial form